Bøverbru is a village in Vestre Toten Municipality in Innlandet county, Norway.

History
The settlement grew up around the Bøverbru Station, a railway station along the Skreiabanen railway line starting in 1902. In the same year, Bøverbru was established as a postal address. The name Bøverbru comes from the name "Bøfr-Broen" (an older spelling) which was used for a local bridge over the river Bøvra. This name can be found in documents dating back to the 18th century. In the first part of the 20th century, quarrying and lime burning were important business activities in the Bøverbru area. The railway line to Bøverbru was closed to passenger traffic in 1963 (and freight traffic continued) and it was closed completely in 1987.

References

Vestre Toten
Villages in Innlandet